Jainapur is a village in Belgaum district in the southern state of Karnataka, India.

Educational institutions
Kannad Primary School Jainapur
Kannad Primary School JainapurTot

Temples
Basaveshwar Temple
Hanuman Temple
Vittal Mandir
Mahadev Mandir
Ganesh Temple
Virabhadreshwar Temple

Medical facilities
Govt primary health care Jainapur

Water resources
Jainapur Lake
Wadral Lake

Ninety percent of farmers and village people are dependent on rain water.

Occupation of the village people
Most of the village people are farmers, some people are teachers, engineers, bus drivers/conductors, clerks, Indian army, police some people work in private sectors.

Industry
Sugar factory Arihant Sugars Ltd is located in the village.

Societies
Common Service Center @ Jainapur
Basaveshwar Consumers Society Jainapur
KMF Jainapur
Shri Ashtavinayak co-opp Society, Jainapur
Library society was started recently.

References

Villages in Belagavi district